The Pappenheim-hilt rapier originated in Germany in 1630 and was popularized by imperial general of the Thirty Years' War (1618–48) Count Pappenheim.  It later became popular throughout Europe due to its two pierced shell guards which provided great protection to the soldier wielding the sword.  Rapiers were used throughout Europe by 1500 and this remained until the late 17th century. Rapiers were used on battlefields, however they were associated more with fashion and duelling for example. This is why they are often intricately designed and delicate.

Early Modern European swords